is a Japanese singer, tarento, and actress. She was born in Zushi, Kanagawa and raised in Kyōto.

Career 
She made her debut in 1969 with the song "Daniel, mon amour". At age 20, she became famous due to the song "Yameté..." and for her singing style which is mixed with sighing. Followed by releases of titles such as Shiseikatsu and Memai, she was soon recognized as a sexy pop singer.

However, in 1972 at the peak of her popularity, she married popular singer Teruhiko Saigō and suddenly retired. As a mother of two children, in 1981 she divorced Saigō and returned to the entertainment world. Following this, she was in the tabloids due to a fuss over her financial troubles and production of a nude photo book.

With the release of the CD Good-Bye Abayo in 1998, her daughter Emiri Henmi makes headlines for managing the photography of the CD. In addition to being a singer and TV tarento, she is also active on stage in musicals.

Family 
Her son is musician Noritaka Henmi; her daughter is Emiri Henmi. Actor Matsuda Kenji is her son-in-law.

TV programs 
 Doyō supesharu (TV Tōkyō)
 Kaiketsu Emichaneru (Kansai TV)

Radio 
 Kayō sukuranburu (Guest. NHK-FM, March 31, 2007)

Kōhaku Uta Gassen Appearances

External links 
 
  Profile at JMDb
  Profile at Yahoo! JAPAN
  Description of 1970 hit song Keiken

1950 births
Japanese women singers
Japanese television actresses
Living people
People from Zushi, Kanagawa
Musicians from Kyoto
Musicians from Kanagawa Prefecture
Actresses from Kanagawa Prefecture
Actresses from Kyoto